John Herman Dent (March 10, 1908 – April 9, 1988) was an American politician who served as a Democratic member of the U.S. House of Representatives from Pennsylvania.

Early life and education
John Dent was born in Jeannette, Pennsylvania, to Samuel and Genevieve Dent. He was educated in the public schools of Armstrong and Westmoreland counties, the Naval Station Great Lakes, and through correspondence school courses.

Business activities
He was a member of the local council of the United Rubber Workers from 1923 to 1937, and served as president of Local 18759, on the executive council, and as a member of the international council.  He operated the Kelden Coal & Coke Co. of Hunker, and the Building & Transportation Co. of Trafford, and Jeannette.

Government activities
He was a Jeannette City Councilman from 1932 to 1934.  He served in the United States Marine Air Corps from 1924 to 1928.  He was a member of the Pennsylvania State House of Representatives from 1935 to 1936, and a member of the Pennsylvania State Senate from 1937 to 1958.  He was the Democratic Floor Leader in the State Senate from 1939 until 1958.

He was elected in 1958 as a Democrat to the 85th United States Congress, by special election, January 21, 1958, to fill the vacancy caused by the death of Augustine Kelley, and was reelected to the ten succeeding Congresses.  He was not a candidate for reelection in 1978.

References

 Retrieved on 2008-02-25
The Political Graveyard

Democratic Party members of the Pennsylvania House of Representatives
Democratic Party Pennsylvania state senators
United States Marines
1908 births
1988 deaths
American trade union leaders
Democratic Party members of the United States House of Representatives from Pennsylvania
20th-century American politicians